Jake Maier (born April 9, 1997) is a professional Canadian football quarterback for the Calgary Stampeders of the Canadian Football League (CFL). He played college football at UC Davis in Davis, California.

College career
Maier played college football for the Long Beach Vikings in 2016 and was named the Southern California Football Association Central Division Offensive Player of the Year. He then transferred to UC Davis for the next three seasons (2017 to 2019). He was named the Big Sky Offensive Player of the Year in 2018. Finished colligate career as the UC Davis career leader in attempts (1,495), completions (992) and yards (11,163), while his career TDs (88) ranked second only to J.T. O'Sullivan.

Statistics

Professional career
After completing his college career, Maier signed with the Calgary Stampeders on May 5, 2020. However, he did not play in 2020 due to the cancellation of the 2020 CFL season.

Upon the conclusion of training camp for the 2021 season, Maier was placed on the injured list for week 1 and was then on the reserve roster for week 2. The Stampeders' incumbent starting quarterback, Bo Levi Mitchell, was injured in week 1 and played through the injury in week 2, but was ultimately placed on the 6-game injured list after the second game of the season. Following a competition in practice, Maier was named the team's starting quarterback over Michael O'Connor for the team's August 20, 2021 game against the Montreal Alouettes. In the win over the Alouettes, he completed 16 of 29 pass attempts for two interceptions and completed his first touchdown pass on a four-yard throw to Kamar Jorden. On September 6, 2021, Maier became the first quarterback in Canadian Football League history to throw for over 300 passing yards in each of his first three career starts.

In his second year in the league Maier was once again the backup to Bo Levi Mitchell. However, in Week 11 he replaced Mitchell in the second half and led the Stamps to victory over the Toronto Argonauts. Maier was named the starting quarterback the following week. Maier continued to be the starter late into the season, helping the team clinch a playoff birth. On September 27, 2022 the Stampeders and Maier agreed to a two-year contract extension.

References

External links
 Calgary Stampeders bio
 UC Davis bio

1997 births
Living people
American football quarterbacks
American players of Canadian football
Calgary Stampeders players
Canadian football quarterbacks
Players of American football from California
Sportspeople from Fullerton, California
UC Davis Aggies football players